Janik Jesgarzewski (born 26 January 1994) is a German professional footballer who plays as a right-back for FC Teutonia Ottensen in the Regionalliga Nord.

Career
Jesgarzewski started playing youth football for SV DJK Geeste, before joining the youth academy of Dutch club Twente in 2004. At Twente he also made his first senior appearances in the second team, Jong FC Twente, on 9 September 2013 as a substitute for Tim Hölscher. In July 2014, he moved to SV Meppen in the Regionalliga Nord. There, he achieved promotion to the 3. Liga at the end of the 2016–17 season. On 22 July 2017, Jesgarzewski made his first professional appearance in the home game against the Würzburger Kickers.

References

1994 births
Living people
People from Lingen
German footballers
Association football fullbacks
Jong FC Twente players
FC Twente players
SV Meppen players
FC Teutonia Ottensen players
Eerste Divisie players
3. Liga players
Regionalliga players
Footballers from Lower Saxony
German expatriate footballers
Expatriate footballers in the Netherlands
German expatriate sportspeople in the Netherlands